Windjammer Surf Racers was a steel racing roller coaster located at Knott's Berry Farm amusement park in Buena Park, California. It sat on the former spot of Wacky Soap Box Racers. The ride was plagued with mechanical issues and only operated sporadically from 1997 to 2000, leading to a lawsuit being filed against the manufacturer, TOGO.

History
On September 26, 1996, Knott's Berry Farm announced a new roller coaster for the 1997 season called Windjammer Surf Racers. It opened to the public on March 26, 1997. Windjammer experienced mechanical issues early on. Within a few weeks of operation, the ride needed several major repairs costing over $2 million. It also quickly gained a negative reputation for being rough, as the over-the-shoulder restraints lacked padding. The racing coaster would also frequently stall in reportedly "slight breezes".

In 1999, an apparel company challenged the coaster's name, which was temporarily changed to "Jammer" until the dispute was resolved. In 2000, Knott's Berry Farm filed a lawsuit against the manufacturer, TOGO, suing for $17 million in damages. Knott's claimed that TOGO poorly engineered the coaster preventing successful operation during its three years. They reported problems including poor track design, defective safety restraints, and wrinkles in the main frame of the trains. The park also claimed that the ride's design flaws prevented operation during medium winds, sometimes stalling even during slight breezes, which Knott's called an "embarrassment." The ride remained closed during the lawsuit as evidence, but Knott's was unable to complete a sale of the ride. TOGO shut their American offices down in March 2001 after filing for Chapter 7 bankruptcy.

In June 2001, the park erected construction walls surrounding Windjammer Surf Racers, and the nearby Headspin scrambler ride was relocated. Windjammer was demolished the following month in July 2001. A hydraulically-launched roller coaster, Xcelerator, was built in its place for the following season.

Ride experience

Windjammer Surf Racers was a unique coaster; it involved small Wild Mouse-like trains running on a full size track. There were two independent tracks (red and yellow) that were constructed parallel to each other, in which the purpose of the ride was to pit both tracks in a race against each other. The coaster's rider load/unloading platform did not have an airgate system to keep queuing guests clear from advancing vehicles within the station.

The ride was dressed as a tribute to the fabled Southern California beach and surf culture, complete with towering palm trees, beach sand, a miniature lagoon, a scaled-down lifeguard watch tower, and other beach-worthy props. The on-ride photograph sales booth was built into the side of a scaled-down replica of a yacht.

The attraction featured a unique interactive element built into the center of the helix finale, known as the “spiral cone.” The spiral cone consisted of  motorized fans semi-enclosed within a steel conical housing structure. The mechanism was designed to simulate a wind effect - giving riders the sensation of  being caught in the eye of a Pacific storm. However, the special effect failed to work as intended, and remained inoperable for most of the ride’s service life.

Layout

After both trains exited the station, they headed up a  chain lift hill. A right turn led into a drop on both tracks. After reaching the bottom of each drop, both sides reached a maximum speed of  before entering a vertical loop. The trains went through several turns and drops and a helix finale before stopping on the final brake run and returning to the station.

Lawsuit
Windjammer Surf Racers did not run frequently because it was plagued with mechanical problems. Just a few weeks into operation, several parts had to be replaced. Knott's Berry Farm spent about $2 million on repairs and inspections alone. Knott's eventually sued TOGO, seeking $17 million in damages, though the lawsuit was eventually rejected. Knott's claimed that TOGO poorly engineered the coaster which prevented successful operation during its three years. They reported problems including poor track design, defective safety restraints, and wrinkles in the main frame of the trains. The park also claimed that the ride's design flaws prevented operation during medium winds, sometimes stalling even during slight breezes, which Knott's called an "embarrassment."

The ride remained closed during the lawsuit as evidence. When Knott's was unable to complete a sale of the ride, it was dismantled in July 2001. In November 2003, the jury rejected Knott's lawsuit in favor of TOGO International.

References

External links
Windjammer Surf Racers at Thrill Network
Pictures/Ride History
Deconstruction Photos at Westcoaster.

Steel roller coasters
Former roller coasters in California
Roller coasters operated by Cedar Fair